Anne-Julia Hagen (born May 22, 1990) is a German model and beauty pageant titleholder who was crowned Miss Universe Germany 2013 and represented her country at the Miss Universe 2013 pageant.

Early life
Hagen was a student of English and American Studies as well as Cultural Studies at the University of Potsdam. She majored in Military Studies and, as of 2018, was enrolled in an individual Ph.D. program. She is fluent in German and English and has a good command of French.

Pageantry career

Miss Germany 2010
Hagen was crowned as Miss Germany 2010 at the Europa Park in Rust on February 13, 2010. She entered the pageant as Miss Berlin 2010.

Miss Universe Germany 2013
Hagen was crowned Miss Universe Germany 2013 at the conclusion of the final casting held on September 8, 2013, in Amersfoort/Netherlands.

References

External links
Official Miss Universe Germany website
Official Miss Germany Corporation website

1990 births
Living people
German beauty pageant winners
Miss Universe 2013 contestants
University of Potsdam alumni
German female models
Models from Berlin
People from Reinickendorf